The Northampton and Lamport Railway is a standard gauge heritage railway in Northamptonshire, England.

Overview

The line between Northampton and Market Harborough was finally closed (by British Rail) on 16 August 1981, the intermediate stations on the route having been closed for many years.

In 1984 (just three years after the line's closure), a group was formed by Michael William Papworth (of Northampton) with the intention of re-opening a section of the line as a heritage railway. The site opened to the public shortly afterwards. Following the granting of a Light Railway Order, the line carried its first fare-paying passengers in November 1995. The official Grand Opening Ceremony took place (just 4 months later) on 31 March 1996.

However as of November 2013, An extension south had currently been under construction which adds another  of running line, with around 90% of track-relaying completed around Spring 2012. Once complete it will include a station with sidings and run-round loop at the former Boughton Crossing on the A5199 at the Northamptonshire village of Boughton.

A northern extension of the NLR to Spratton currently remains within the planning stage. The previous extension heading north, opened after several years' work and around £50,000 was spent on repairs to Bridge 13, (the same amount (or more) will be required for Bridge 14, when the NLR turns its intention northwards).

The signalling system, with three working signal boxes (at Pitsford and Brampton station, Pitsford Sidings and Boughton), makes it one of the most comprehensive and detailed on any heritage railway of its size, within Preservation. It had since been converted in such a way that it can be easily converted back into a signal box if whenever required in the future.

The Brampton Valley Way is a "linear park" offering a traffic-free route for walkers, cyclists and pedestrians, and which runs alongside the railway, separated by a stout safety fence. Access is also available to horse riders on other sections away from the railway.

The railway is open for viewing from 10:00 to 17:00 on Sundays. Train rides are available on Sundays from March to October, diesel hauled with steam-hauled trains for special events (subject to availability). Open from March to October and throughout December for Santa's visit.

Events

A number of special events take place throughout the year, the popular Santa Specials run throughout the month of December.

On 18 July 2007, the Railway at War weekend, an event held at the railway every September, was named Best Event in the 2007 Northamptonshire Renaissance Heritage Awards.

Locomotives

Steam
GWR  2884 Class No. 3862. Built in 1942. Under restoration.
GWR  4900 Class No. 5967 Bickmarsh Hall. Built in 1937. Under restoration.
Peckett and Sons  No. 2104. Built in 1948. Withdrawn January 2017, awaiting overhaul.
Peckett and Sons  No. 1378 Westminster. Built in 1914 for the Fovant Military Railway Under restoration.
Andrew Barclay Sons & Co.  No. 776 Firefly. Built in 1896. Under restoration.
Andrew Barclay  No. 2323. Built in 1952. Under restoration.
Hawthorn Leslie and Company  No. 3718 Swanscombe No. 4. Built in 1928. Operational, returned to steam in 2019.

Main line diesel
British Rail Class 31 A1A-A1A No. 31289 Phoenix - operational
British Rail Class 33 Bo-Bo No. 33053 - operational
British Rail Class 47 Co-Co No. 47205 - operational

Industrial diesel and shunters
Ruston & Hornsby  165DS No. 764 Sir Gyles Isham (first locomotive to arrive on the line) - operational
Ruston & Hornsby  165DS No. 53 Sir Alfred Wood - under repair
Fowler  No. 21 - Spares recovery before scrapping

Carriages
British Rail Mark 3 DVT No. 82114 - being prepared for service by NLRCIO the vehicle owners
British Rail Mark 2 TSO No. 5174 - in service
British Rail Mark 2 TSO No. 5132, formerly named Clan Munro- operational
British Rail Mark 2 BSO(T) No. 9102. - in service.
British Rail Mark 1 TSO No. 3919. - being overhauled by NLRCIO, the vehicle owners.
British Rail Mark 1 RBR (Buffet Car) No. 1647 - out of service for repairs
British Rail Mark 1 NAV No. 84031 - operational (as temporary Buffet)

Gallery

References

External links
Homepage of the Northampton & Lamport Railway

Heritage railways in Northamptonshire
Rail transport in Northamptonshire
Tourist attractions in Northamptonshire